Kulachi Hansraj Model School, India, was established in 1972 by the late Shri Darbari Lal. It is a Dayanand Anglo Vedic (D.A.V.) school which educates students from kindergarten to senior secondary school grades.

The school began in the 1970s with 60 students and four teachers in two classrooms. The school's motto is "to strive, to seek, to find and not to yield". It is an ISO 9001:2000 certified school.

Kulachi Hansraj Model School has three wings across Ashok Vihar. The main and high school branch is in phase III, while the primary school and the nursery branch is in phase I.  

The school had 7,500 students on its roll in 2005, 300 teachers and a non-teaching staff of 150 in four campuses, under the guidance of Chairman Late Padamshree G. P. Chopra and Mrs. Sneh Verma.

Infrastructure
School has partially automated and ample stocked libraries.
It has a playground in one of its branches (senior wing - ashok vihar IV).
General training is given in sports like hockey, table tennis, cricket, basketball, volleyball, handball, chess, skating.
School has rainwater harvesting system.
Wind powered exhaust fans.
Adequate fleet of CNG buses.
Security cameras all around the premises.
Cafeteria/canteen.
Huge auditorium to accommodate 1000+ people.
Different extra-curricular activities.
Vermi compost pit.
Yagya shala for peaceful environment.
Well adequately equipped physics lab, chemistry lab, biology lab, biotechnology lab, engineering graphics lab.
Technology equipped classrooms.

External links
 Official website
 DAV College Managing Committee website
 DAV Education Board official website
Kulachi Hansraj Model School official website

Schools in Delhi
Educational institutions established in 1972
Schools affiliated with the Arya Samaj